WJEM (1150 AM) is a radio station broadcasting a sports format. Licensed to Valdosta, Georgia, United States, the station is currently owned by Smalltown Broadcasting, LLC. The station began broadcasting in August 1955.

Previous logo
 (WJEM's logo under previous 96.1 translator)

References

External links

JEM
1955 establishments in Georgia (U.S. state)
Radio stations established in 1955
Fox Sports Radio stations